Stabskapitänleutnant, short: StKptLt / in lists: SKL, is the highest Fachdienstoffizier rank (en: specialist officer, comparable to US warrant officer) in the German Navy.

The rank is rated OF-2a in NATO, and equivalent to Stabshauptmann in Heer, and Luftwaffe. It is grade A13 in the pay rules of the Federal Ministry of Defence and is senior to the regular OF-2 rank of Kapitänleutnant (en: Lt).

Address
The official manner, in line to ZDv 10/8, of formal addressing of military people with the rank Stabskapitänleutnant (OF-2a) is “Herr/Frau Stabskapitänleutnant“. However, as to German traditions and in line to seamen's language the “Stabskapitänleutnant“ will be addressed „Herr/Frau Kaleu“.

Rank insignia
Its rank insignia, worn on the sleeves and shoulders, are one five-pointed star above two stripes with two half stripes between them (without the star when rank loops are worn).

Particularity
Military people of the “line officer career” skip over this rank, by regular promotion from Kapitänleutnant (OF-2) to Korvettenkapitän (OF-3); however, the pay grade A13 (Stabskapitänleutnant and Korvettenkapitän) is identical.

The sequence of ranks (top-down approach) in that particular group is as follows:
OF-2a: Stabskapitänleutnant / Stabshauptmann
OF-2: Kapitänleutnant / Hauptmann
OF-1a: Oberleutnant zur See / Oberleutnant
OF-1: Leutnant zur See / Leutnant

See also
 Limited duty officer

References

Naval ranks of Germany